Agnostochthona is a genus of thrips in the family Phlaeothripidae.

Species
 Agnostochthona alienigera

References

Phlaeothripidae
Thrips genera